Fatal accidents on the Nürburgring motorsport race track in Nürburg, Germany during national and international  motor-sport events on the  Gesamtstrecke ("Whole Course"), the  Nordschleife ("Northern Loop"), the  Südschleife ("Southern Loop") and the  warm-up loop Zielschleife ("Finish Loop") or Betonschleife. From 1984, the  new GP-Strecke or Eifelring which was built on the site of the Nürburgring pits complex and part of the Südschleife. This list does not cover fatalities from public sessions.

List of fatal accidents involving competitors

List of fatal accidents involving spectators

List of fatal accidents involving race officials

List of fatal accidents during unofficial testing

Sources

Nurburgring